The Kingpin is the debut studio album by American rapper Craig G. It was released in 1989 via Atlantic Records. Audio production was handled by Marley Marl.

Track listing

Sample credits
Track 2 contains elements from "A Quiet Storm" by Smokey Robinson (1975)
Track 3 contains elements from "Rock the House (You'll Never Be)" by Pressure Drop (1983)
Track 4 contains elements from "Long Red" by Mountain (1972), "Just a Friend" by Biz Markie (1989)
Tracks 5 and 6 contain elements from "Think (About It)" by Lyn Collins (1972)
Track 7 contains elements from "Firecracker" by Yellow Magic Orchestra (1978)
Track 10 contains elements from "Soul Power 74" by Maceo & the Macks (1974)

Personnel
Craig Curry - main performer
Marlon Lu'ree Williams - mixing & recording (tracks: 2, 5-7, 9, 11), producer
Andre Carrillo - vocals (track 10)
Thomas 'On Time' - mixing & recording (tracks: 1, 4, 8, 10, 12)
Leon Lee - mixing & recording (track 3)
Dennis King - mastering
Bob Defrin - art direction
Anthony Ranieri - design
Frank Moscati - photography

References

External links 

Craig G albums
1989 debut albums
Atlantic Records albums
Albums produced by Marley Marl